LZ4 may refer to:

Transportation
 LZ 4 (Luftschiff Zeppelin 4), a German experimental airship
 LZ4, a GM High Value engine
 SpaceX Landing Zone 4, located at SLC-4 West, at Vandenberg Air Force Base Space Launch Complex 4

Other uses
 LZ4 (compression algorithm), a data compression algorithm
 24944 Harish-Chandra, a main-belt asteroid formerly called 1997 LZ4
 Led Zeppelin IV, an album by Led Zeppelin